Mohd. Azrif Nasrulhaq bin Badrul Hisham (born 27 May 1991 in Selangor) is a Malaysian professional footballer who plays for Malaysia Super League club Sri Pahang on loan fron Johor Darul Ta'zim. He mainly plays as a right-back but can also play as a right-winger.

Club career

Born and raised in Kota Damansara in Petaling Jaya, Azrif started his career with PKNS youth club in 2010 at age 18. The national youth club Harimau Muda A was impressed with his strong performance with PKNS reserve side and won a bronze medal in Sukma Games while representing Selangor. Azrif played for Harimau Muda A for 2013 and 2014 season. He later joined Selangor after he exceeded the age limit for Harimau Muda A.

On 29 June 2016, Johor Darul Ta'zim have finally officially announced their intention of signing Azrif from Selangor, after a month of speculation. On 15 July 2016, Azrif signed with a contract with Johor Darul Ta'zim after Football Association of Selangor (FAS) and the Johor Football Association (JFA) agreed on the transfer.

International career
On 17 November 2015, Azrif made his debut for the Malaysia national team coming off the bench in a 1–2 defeat to United Arab Emirates.

Career statistics

Club

International

Honours

Club
Selangor
 Malaysia Cup: 2015

Johor Darul Ta'zim
 Malaysia Cup (2): 2017, 2019
 Malaysia Super League (5): 2016, 2017, 2018,2019, 2020
 Malaysia Charity Shield (4): 2019, 2020, 2021, 2022

References

External links
 
 

Malaysian footballers
1991 births
Living people
PKNS F.C. players
Selangor FA players
Johor Darul Ta'zim F.C. players
Malaysia Super League players
People from Petaling District
Malaysia international footballers
Footballers at the 2014 Asian Games
Association football fullbacks
Association football wingers
Asian Games competitors for Malaysia